BC Kamza Basket is an Albanian basketball team that plays in the Albanian Basketball League. They were previously named BC Valbona Bajram Curri and based in the northern city of Tropoja, but relocated to Kamez in 2010.

Domestic achievements 
Albanian Basketball League (6): 
2003, 2004, 2005, 2006, 2007, 2013
Albanian Basketball Cup (6):
2003, 2004, 2005, 2006, 2013, 2016
Albanian Basketball Supercup (2) 
2013, 2014

Current roster

Notable former players 

Albania & Kosovo
  Eni Llazani
  Nikolin Arra
  Gjon Ndoja
  Vildan Mitku
  Alfred Biberaj
  Afrim Bilali
  Roald Cubaj
  Endrit Hysenagolli
  Elvis Ismeti
  Arber Kadia
  Sokol Kasmi
  Henri Moja

Albania & Kosovo
  Maris Huti
  Endrit Hysenagolli
  Arjonel Lame
  Agron Lamnica
  Marlin Sukaj
  Juxhin Talelli
  Ardian Domi
  Heroin Faslija
  Olton Fishta
  Marlen Gjeli
  Shkelzen Llazani
  Erblin Madani

Albania & Kosovo
  Andi Mustafaj
  Elvis Saiti
  Elvis Saiti
  Elton Saliaga
  Mikel Serbo
  Real Vorfa
  Algert Gjonaj
  Admir Hoxha
  Edmond Azemi
  Simon Ivezaj
  David Dedvukaj

Foreign
  Dragan Pejić
  Dino Hodžić
  Ratko Stevović
  Danilo Vojvodić

References

Kamza
Kamëz
Basketball teams established in 1962